Viburnum betulifolium, the birchleaf viburnum, is a species of flowering plant in the family Viburnaceae, native to China and the island of Taiwan. Shade tolerant, it is often dominant in the shrub layer of the forests in which it occurs. Widely cultivated outside of China, it has attractive bronze to burgundy Autumn foliage, and the masses of bright red berries are attractive to birds. It is hardy to USDA zone 4.

References

betulifolium
Flora of Inner Mongolia
Flora of Tibet
Flora of North-Central China
Flora of South-Central China
Flora of Southeast China
Flora of Taiwan
Plants described in 1894